Bharath Bala is an Indian film director, screenwriter and film producer based in Chennai, Tamil Nadu.

Career
Bharat Bala produced the acclaimed album Vande Mataram and  Jana Gana Mana Video and heads BharatBala Productions based in Chennai. He directed a short film Hari Om in 2004. He was set to direct and produce Indo-Japanese film, co-produced by Disney, called The 19th Step, written by and starring Kamal Haasan, but the film was later shelved. He directed the music video of official song of the 2010 Commonwealth Games, Jiyo Utho Bado Jeeto and also the opening ceremony of the games. In 2013, he completed his first feature film, Maryan, which opened to good reviews but turned out to be an average grosser.

Filmography 
 Hari Om (2004)
 Maryan (2013)

Awards 

Bharatbala has won several awards in his career. These awards have been for advertising films, feature films and special film projects that include:

 1st Prize at The International Exhibition of Tourism TOUR SALON 2005 & 2006 in Poland for "Incredible India".
 Finalist at the Cannes Lion International Advertising Film Festival in 1998 for "Vande Mataram – Timeless India".
 Finalist at New York Film Festival in 1998 for "Vande Mataram – Maa Tujhe Salaam".
 Channel V, India, voted "Vande Mataram" as the Best Audio Product, Best TV Ad Campaign & Best Music Video in 1998.
 New Voices Award & Best Debut Filmmaker Award at Bangkok International Film Festival in 2005 for "Hari Om".
 Citizen's Choice Best Film Audience Award at Puchon International Film Festival (South Korea) in 2005 for "Hari Om".
 Audience Choice Award at Indian Film Festival of Los Angeles in 2005 for "Hari Om".
 Runner Up (along with "Motorcycle Diaries") for the People's Choice Award for Most Popular International Film at the Vancouver International Film Festival in 2005 for "Hari Om".
 Best Foreign Film Award at Tahoe International Film Festival (USA) in 2005 for "Hari Om".

References

External links
 
 

Living people
Tamil-language film directors
21st-century Indian film directors
Film directors from Chennai
Film producers from Chennai
Year of birth missing (living people)